Amadou Camara (born 10 September 1994) is a Guinean Olympic swimmer.

Career
He represented his country at the 2016 Summer Olympics in the Men's 50 metre freestyle event where he ranked at #78 with a time of 27.35 seconds. He did not advance to the semifinals.

Amadou Camara did not return to Guinea after the 2016 Summer Olympics in Brazil, having disappeared 48 hours before the team's scheduled departure.

References 

1994 births
Living people
Guinean male swimmers
Swimmers at the 2016 Summer Olympics
Olympic swimmers of Guinea
Place of birth missing (living people)
Defectors